( – January 8, 1282) was a rensho of the Kamakura shogunate from 1273 to 1277.

1240s births
1282 deaths
Hōjō clan
People of Kamakura-period Japan